Tess Flintoff (born 31 March 2003) is an Australian cricketer who plays for Victoria in the Women's National Cricket League (WNCL) and the Melbourne Stars in the Women's Big Bash League (WBBL). An all-rounder, she bats right-handed and bowls right-arm medium pace. In 2015, Flintoff was named in Cricket Australia's under-15 Talent Squad and in 2020 she was selected to play for Australia's under-19 team for a planned tour to South Africa.

In January 2022, Flintoff was named in Australia's A squad for their series against England A, with the matches being played alongside the Women's Ashes. 

During the 2022-23 Women's Big Bash League, she hit a 16-ball fifty against Adelaide Strikers. It is the fastest fifty in Women's Big Bash League and the second-fastest recorded fifty Women's Twenty20 cricket after Marie Kelly's 15-ball fifty earlier in the same year. Her team Melbourne Stars scored 186/5 then, which is their highest total in Women's BBL.

References

External links

Tess Flintoff at Cricket Australia

2003 births
Living people
Australian women cricketers
Melbourne Stars (WBBL) cricketers
Victoria women cricketers
Place of birth missing (living people)